U.S. Route 3 (US 3) is a United States Numbered Highway running  from Cambridge, Massachusetts, through New Hampshire, to the Canada–US border near Third Connecticut Lake, where it connects to Quebec Route 257.

Route 3 connects to the southern terminus of US 3 in Cambridge and continues south to Cape Cod. Though it shares a number, it has never been part of US 3. Both routes, which connect end-to-end, are treated as a single  state highway by the Massachusetts Department of Transportation (MassDOT). From Cambridge to Burlington, US 3 is routed on surface streets through the dense suburbs in the Greater Boston area. After a brief concurrency with Interstate 95 (I-95) and Route 128, the route follows its own freeway northwest, bypassing Lowell and entering New Hampshire at Nashua, becoming the Everett Turnpike.

In New Hampshire, current and former parts of US 3 are known as the Daniel Webster Highway. From Burlington, Massachusetts, to Nashua, New Hampshire, US 3 is a freeway. The segment in New Hampshire is a free portion of the Everett Turnpike, while the portion in Massachusetts is known as the Northwest Expressway. From where it leaves the Everett Turnpike in Nashua northward, US 3 is generally a two-to-four lane at-grade road, though there are two super-two freeway portions in northern New Hampshire, one on the Laconia Bypass, and one where US 3 and I-93 use the Franconia Notch Parkway. The route serves as a major local arterial, connecting many of the cities of the densely populated Merrimack Valley. North of the White Mountains, the route serves as one of the only north–south roads connecting the communities of the Great North Woods Region and has New Hampshire's only border crossing between the US and Canada.

Route description

|-
|
|
|-
|
|
|-
|Total
|
|}

Massachusetts

Cambridge to Burlington
US 3 begins in the south along Memorial Drive in Cambridge, along the Charles River, at an interchange with Massachusetts Avenue (Route 2A). The road continues as southbound Route 3 toward Downtown Boston, while northbound US 3 heads west, then north along the river toward Harvard University, joining with Route 2 along the way. It runs along the north bank of the Charles River, opposite Soldiers Field Road in Allston along this stretch. Passing south of Harvard Square, US 3 and Route 2 transition onto the Fresh Pond Parkway and join Route 16. Near Alewife station, Route 2 splits off as a freeway to the west (Concord Turnpike), while US 3 and Route 16 stay on the Alewife Brook Parkway. Shortly thereafter, US 3 splits from the parkway (which continues as Route 16) and joins Route 2A (Massachusetts Avenue) westbound, crossing into Arlington. In the center of town, US 3 and Route 2A split from Massachusetts Avenue and overlap briefly with Route 60 before continuing along Mystic Street. Route 2A splits from US 3 just to the north. US 3 continues through parts of Winchester and Woburn without any major intersections before entering Burlington and interchanging with I-95 and Route 128 (Yankee Division Highway) at exit 51A. US 3 joins the freeway to connect with the Northwest Expressway, while its historic surface alignment continues as Route 3A.

Burlington to Tyngsborough (Northwest Expressway)
US 3 runs along  of I-95 (Route 128) in a wrong-way concurrency before exiting at exit 50A onto its own freeway, the Northwest Expressway.

Originally built in the 1950s, before the cancelation of the Inner Belt, the US 3 freeway was to have extended into metro Boston before being truncated to I-95. Consequently, a partially completed cloverleaf interchange connects US 3 to I-95. Exit numbers on the US 3 freeway start at milemarker 72 since Route 3 and US 3 are counted as one highway by MassDOT.

The freeway closely parallels Route 3A, the historic alignment of US 3, along its entire  length from Burlington to the New Hampshire state border. It passes through Billerica and into Chelmsford, where it connects with I-495 and the Lowell Connector, a freeway spur into downtown Lowell. Continuing north, the freeway briefly enters Lowell, then passes through North Chelmsford and Tyngsborough before crossing the state line into Nashua, New Hampshire. The freeway continues north as the Everett Turnpike.

The Burlington to Tyngsborough area maintains a 501(c)6 nonprofit representative entity known as the Middlesex 3 Coalition and its affiliate agency the Middlesex 3 TMA, which provides collaborative support to businesses and individuals within the jurisdiction to build consensus on transportation and developmental needs.

New Hampshire
US 3 passes through most of the state's major cities and towns and is the only highway to extend from the Massachusetts state border in the south to the Canada–US border in the north. For much of its routing, US 3 closely parallels I-93, serving as a local route to the freeway.

US 3 crosses the state border into Nashua and immediately becomes concurrent with the Everett Turnpike, running on the freeway for  along the western side of the city. US 3 leaves the Everett Turnpike at exit 7E, crosses New Hampshire Route 101A (NH 101A) and turns northeast for approximately  along a segment known as the Henri Burque Highway, before turning north onto Concord Street, which soon becomes known as the Daniel Webster Highway. (Some locals erroneously refer to the Everett Turnpike from exit 7 through the I-293 interchange as US 3 and refer to the actual US 3 only as the Daniel Webster Highway or "Old Route 3".)

US 3 continues north through the town of Merrimack and into Bedford, where it becomes South River Road. The highway parallels I-293 until it turns east in Manchester and then crosses the Merrimack River on Queen City Avenue, just after its intersection with I-293/NH 3A and NH 114A. US 3 and NH 3A are signed in a wrong-way concurrency for approximately  before US 3 turns north onto Elm Street toward downtown Manchester. The two routes continue as Hooksett Road, then the Daniel Webster Highway.

In Suncook, NH 28 leaves to the northeast, and US 3 proceeds northwest toward Concord on Pembroke Street, becoming Manchester Street when it enters the Concord city limits. After crossing the Merrimack River and interchanging with I-93, US 3 intersects NH 3A (South Main Street), which terminates at its parent route. US 3 traverses downtown Concord as North and South Main streets (briefly overlapping with US 202 and NH 9), then follows North State Street to Fisherville Road to Village Street in Penacook before crossing the Contoocook River into Boscawen. US 3 travels north through Boscawen, briefly overlapping with US 4. The highway parallels the Merrimack River north into Franklin, where the highway meets NH 11. US 3 joins NH 11 and turns east; NH 3A also resumes at this intersection, continuing north. US 3 and NH 11 briefly form a three-route concurrency with NH 127 in Franklin, then pass through Tilton, crossing NH 132 and passing the western end of NH 140. Continuing northeast past Lake Winnisquam, US 3 and NH 11 reach Laconia and turn onto the Laconia–Gilford Bypass, intersecting with NH 106, NH 107, and NH 11A. At the northern end of the bypass, US 3 and NH 11 split after a  overlap, with the U.S. Route continuing north on Lake Street to Weirs Beach and an intersection with NH 11B. US 3 continues north as the Daniel Webster Highway to Meredith at the northern end of Meredith Bay on Lake Winnipesaukee. In Meredith, US 3 intersects the northern terminus of NH 106, then joins NH 25 and continues north past Squam Lake into Holderness, passing the western terminuses of NH 25B and NH 113. Through Holderness, US 3 and NH 25 gradually turn west, then southwest, passing the southern end of NH 175 and then reaching the northern end of NH 132 in Ashland.

From Ashland to North Woodstock, US 3 proceeds north, roughly paralleling I-93 in the Pemigewasset River valley. Along this stretch it passes through the towns of Plymouth (NH 25 splits from US 3 near I-93 in Plymouth, which also marks the true northern terminus of NH 3A), West Campton (where it meets the western end of NH 49, the principal access road to Waterville Valley), Thornton, and Woodstock. In North Woodstock, US 3 crosses NH 112 (known to the east as the Kancamagus Highway).

Continuing north, US 3 joins with I-93 as it passes through Franconia Notch State Park, one of the more scenic drives in the White Mountains. This stretch of freeway is known as the Franconia Notch Parkway and is a rare section Interstate Highway with only one lane in each direction.

US 3 separates from I-93 at exit 35, shortly north of the northern park boundary in Franconia. From there, NH 141 branches northwest and US 3 heads north and east toward Twin Mountain and a junction with US 302. This portion of the road is noted for fairly frequent moose sightings, especially during sunrise and sunset when moose are particularly active.

Heading north from Twin Mountain, US 3 passes through the village of Carroll, where NH 115 branches to the northeast and US 3 bears to the northwest and the town of Whitefield. In the center of Whitefield, NH 142 branches to the northwest and NH 116 crosses, running roughly southwest to northeast. US 3 continues north to Lancaster, where it joins US 2 in the town center, and where NH 135 branches off to the west. After US 2 leaves to the west, US 3 continues north, roughly paralleling the course of the Connecticut River (which also forms the border with Vermont), through Northumberland and Groveton, where NH 110 ends. North of Groveton, US 3 continues to follow the river, through Stratford, North Stratford, and Columbia, until it reaches Colebrook, where it crosses NH 26 and meets the southern terminus of NH 145. Still following the Connecticut River north, US 3 passes through portions of Stewartstown and Clarksville. In Stewartstown, the road turns more directly east (still following the Connecticut River, which is no longer a boundary), before resuming a northeasterly direction through Pittsburg. Its last major intersection is at the northern terminus of NH 145. US 3 continues north for another , eventually reaching the Pittsburg–Chartierville Border Crossing, where the road crosses into Chartierville, Quebec, and becomes Quebec Route 257.

Sections of US 3 in Colebrook are named after Scott E. Phillips and Leslie G. Lord, members of the New Hampshire State Police killed in the line of duty on August 19, 1997.

History

New England route

Before the establishment of the U.S. Numbered Highway System, the section of US 3 and Route 3 from Orleans, Massachusetts, to Colebrook, New Hampshire, was part of the New England road marking system as New England Route 6. It was replaced in its entirety with the establishment of US 3 and Route 3 in 1926.

Massachusetts
US 3 in Massachusetts closely follows the route of the early 19th-century Middlesex Canal and Middlesex Turnpike.

The modern Northwest Expressway was begun near Route 110 in Lowell before World War II. In the 1950s, it was extended south to Route 128 (later overlapped by I-95), and, by the 1960s, it was completed north from Chelmsford to New Hampshire. By 2005, the chronically congested four-lane road, largely with antiquated ramps around Lowell, was widened to six lanes (as it had been in Nashua, New Hampshire, a few years prior) with a breakdown lane on both the left and right sides of the road, and many interchanges were modernized in what was comically known as "The Big Wide", in reference to Massachusetts' other "Big" construction project (the Big Dig). The roadbed and bridges were built to support a fourth lane in each travel direction for future expansion. The $365-million (equivalent to $ in ),  widening project was completed in 2005 from Burlington to the New Hampshire border.

The final section of the expressway was planned for inner suburban towns northwest of Boston, Massachusetts. The expressway was to supply a new route for US 3, between Route 128 and the canceled I-695 (Inner Belt). This was one of the expressway projects canceled in Governor Francis Sargent's 1970 moratorium on expressway construction within Route 128. The latter section of the expressway was a key component of the "Master Plan Highway Plan for Metropolitan Boston". The highway would have traveled through Lexington, Arlington, Medford, Somerville, and Cambridge, before linking with the Inner Belt Expressway.

The original plan called for US 3 and Route 2 to link up at the Lexington–Arlington border and continue southeasterly, crossing Route 16/Mystic Valley Parkway at the Arlington–Somerville border and proceeding into Cambridge toward Union Square, Somerville. A 1962 plan called for Route 2 and US 3 to converge at Alewife Brook Parkway with a longer stretch of new highway for US 3 paralleling Lowell Street in Lexington and Summer Street in Arlington.

Exit numbers along the Northwest Expressway section in Massachusetts were to be changed to mileage based numbers under a project to start in 2016, but that project was postponed. However, in November 2019, the MassDOT announced it would be proceeding with the project in late mid-2020.

Terminuses
According to the American Association of State Highway and Transportation Officials (AASHTO) route log, the southern terminus of US 3 is at the junction of Route 2A and Route 3 in Cambridge, which is where Route 2A crosses the Charles along the Harvard Bridge (also known as the Massachusetts Avenue Bridge). This is a change from AASHTO's 1989 Route Log which placed the terminus at US 20 in Boston, where Route 2 currently meets US 20 after crossing the Charles River at the Boston University Bridge. This was where US 3 met US 1 until that highway was rerouted in 1971.

The original northern terminus of US 3 (in 1926) was at Colebrook, New Hampshire, but the highway was extended to West Stewartstown in 1928 and to Pittsburg in 1937. Colebrook was the northern terminus again from 1939 to 1940. Since 1940, the highway has run through Pittsburg to the Pittsburg–Chartierville Border Crossing.

Major intersections
Although MassDOT inventories Route 3 and US 3 as one continuous route, this table includes the mileage only for US 3 starting from its southern terminus in Cambridge.

Special routes
US 3 has one existing special route, a business route through Laconia, New Hampshire. Four other special routes may have existed in the past: an alternate and business route between Tyngsborough, Massachusetts, and Concord, New Hampshire, and bypass routes around Concord and Nashua, New Hampshire.

Tyngsborough–Concord alternate route

Tyngsborough–Concord business route

Concord bypass route

Nashua bypass route

Laconia business loop

U.S. Route 3 Business (US 3 Bus.) is a  signed business route running north–south through downtown Laconia, New Hampshire. It runs from US 3 and NH 11 in Belmont north to US 3 in Laconia, along NH 107 and NH 11A. It is a former alignment of US 3, used before the Laconia–Gilford bypass was built.

See also

References

External links

 US 3/Northwest Expressway on Bostonroads.com
 Photos of US 3 in New Hampshire
 Endpoints of U.S. Highway 3

 
03
03
03
Transportation in Middlesex County, Massachusetts
Transportation in Hillsborough County, New Hampshire
Transportation in Merrimack County, New Hampshire
Transportation in Belknap County, New Hampshire
Transportation in Grafton County, New Hampshire
Transportation in Coös County, New Hampshire